Anardar may refer to:

Anardar-e Bala
Anardar-e Pain